Adagoor may refer to places in India:

 Adagoor, Mysore, Karnataka
 Adagoor, Tumkur, Karnataka